New Legend of Madame White Snake is a 1992 TV series starring Angie Chiu and Cecilia Yip. It is based on the Chinese folk legend Legend of the White Snake. First shown on Taiwan Television in 1992, the series was broadcast on China Central Television in 1993 and became a major hit. It remained popular for more than 20 years, and was still one of the most replayed TV series in 2016.

Plot
After hundreds, perhaps thousands, of years of disciplined training in Taoism whilst living in a cave on Mount Emei, the  protagonist Bai Su Zhen (Pure White Silk) has, with the help of a heavenly immortality pill, transformed herself from her true original form as a snake into a human form to seek immortality in the human world in her quest for divinity, guided by the Mother of Mercy, Guan Yin (lit. "Watcher of the World's Cry")

She then meets and masters in single combat her would be ravisher. He then transforms himself into a female form and becomes her aide de camp. He is known as Xiao Qing ("Small Green") and like Bai had originally been a serpent.

Bai at some point had been saved from being killed for her snake gall by a young cow-herd known to her only as her benefactor. One of her reasons to enter the human world was to repay him. Guan Yin had told him he would meet a higher man on Tomb Sweeping Day at the West Lake. Whether higher was meant literally or metaphorically was uncertain. Bai and Xiao Qing together search for this benefactor. Bai finds him and it is love at first sight. They meet on the Broken Bridge on Tomb Sweeping Day. Hanwen is there to visit the grave of his deceased parents. In this life Hanwen works in a pharmacy and studies medicine. Because Hanwen had saved Bai in her previous life when she was a snake she wishes to repay him. The two fall in love, marry, have a child, and are pursued all along the way by a religious zealot, Fa Hai. Fa Hai believes that a demon is always a demon and can never become good and belongs not in the human world hence his dogged pursuit. Bai has a child with Hanwen after their marriage. To save that child she agrees to be imprisoned in Lei Feng Pagoda (which literally means thundering wind tower), a symbol of the tomb.

Characters
 Angie Chiu - Bai Suzhen / Hu Meiniang  白素貞 / 胡媚娘
 Cecilia Yip - Xu Xian / Xu Shi Lin  許仙 / 許仕林
 Maggie Chen (陳美琪) - Xiao Qing (Qing'er)  青兒
 Liao Wei Kai (廖威凱) as young Xu Shi Lin
 Chien Te-men (乾德門) as Fa Hai 法海
 Jiang Ming (江明) as Li Gong Fu 李公甫
 Yin Bao Lian (尹寶蓮) as Xu Jiao Rong 許姣容
 Xia Guang Li (夏光莉) as Li Bi Lian 李碧蓮
 Su Yu Xuan (蘇育玄) as young Li Bi Lian
 Shi Nai Wen (石乃文) as Qi Bao Shan 戚寶山

References

Taiwanese television series
Works based on the Legend of the White Snake
Television series set in the Southern Song
Romantic fantasy television series
Television about fairies and sprites